Garland Junior College (1872–1976) was a liberal arts women's college in Boston, Massachusetts. Mary Garland established the Garland Kindergarten Training School in 1872 on Chestnut Street in Boston's Beacon Hill. By 1903, the school had expanded its curriculum to include home economics, and was renamed the Garland School of Homemaking. It was authorized as a junior college in 1948, and subsequently granted the AS degree as Garland Junior College. Studies in the visual arts became the AA program, and curriculum included illustration, fine art painting, graphic design, and jewelry design. Marc Brown, author of the "Arthur" children's book series, taught illustration at Garland during the 70s.

In March 1976, economic shifts resulted in a vote by the Board of Trustees to transfer the Garland Junior College name, physical facilities, and certain other assets to Simmons College. Garland Junior College graduated its last class of 98 students in May 1976.

Notable alumni
 Susan Farmer, Rhode Island politician and businesswoman
 Tipper Gore, Second Lady of the United States
 Anne Sexton, poet
 Bunny Williams, interior decorator.

External links
Simmons College Archives. History of the Garland School.

Educational institutions established in 1872
Defunct private universities and colleges in Massachusetts
Educational institutions disestablished in 1976
Universities and colleges in Boston
1872 establishments in Massachusetts